Monterotondo Marittimo is a comune (municipality) in the Province of Grosseto in the Italian region Tuscany, located about  southwest of Florence and about  northwest of Grosseto, near the Colline Metallifere.

Frazioni 
The municipality is formed by the municipal seat of Monterotondo Marittimo and the villages (frazioni) of Frassine and Lago Boracifero.

References

External links

Official website